"Bruise Pristine" is a song by English alternative rock band Placebo, released in its original version as a split single with the band Soup by record label Fierce Panda in October 1995. It was re-recorded for the band's 1996 self-titled debut album, and this version was released in May 1997 as the fifth and final single from the album.

Composition

The song is a heavy riff-based track and is notable for its "behind the bridge" guitar solo. It's played in F-A-D-G-C-C tuning. It opens with a natural harmonics riff on the 12th fret. It proceeds with an overdriven riff that's played during the verses. During the chorus there's a chromatic power chord progression from F to G.

There are three official versions of the song that have been released: the 1995 single version, the album track and the radio edit. The radio edit is intended to be more radio friendly; after the intro it cuts directly to the vocal verse and the solo is cut short.

Release

"Bruise Pristine" was originally released on record label Fierce Panda as a split seven-inch single with Soup in October 1995. This version is different from the one which later appeared on their 1996 debut album. The 1995 single version was later featured on the Fierce Panda compilation Nings and Roundabouts.

The song was released on 12 May 1997 by record label Virgin as the fifth and final single from Placebo. It was released on 7" vinyl, cassette and CD. The single charted at number 14 in the UK Singles Chart. A music video was made to promote the single.

Track listing

1995 7-inch single 

 Fierce Side
Placebo – "Bruise Pristine"
 Panda Side
Soup – "m.e.l.t.d.o.w.n."

1997 single 

CD 1 and cassette
"Bruise Pristine (Radio Edit)"
"Then the Clouds Will Open for Me"
"Bruise Pristine (1" Punch Mix)"

CD 2 
"Bruise Pristine"
"Waiting for the Son of Man"
"Bruise Pristine (Lionrock Mix)"

 7" vinyl
"Bruise Pristine (Radio Edit)" – 3:01
"Bruise Pristine (1" Punch Mix)" – 4:38

Charts

Release history

References

External links
  (1995 split single)
  (1997 single)

Placebo (band) songs
1995 debut singles
1997 singles
1995 songs
Songs written by Brian Molko
Virgin Records singles
Songs written by Robert Schultzberg
Songs written by Stefan Olsdal
Music videos directed by Howard Greenhalgh